A121 may refer to:
 A121 road (England), a road connecting Waltham Cross and Woodford
 A121 road (Malaysia), a road in Perak connecting the Slim River and Behrang Ulu